Bernard Thomas Tréhouart de Beaulieu (14 January 1754 – 12 November 1804) was a French businessman, major of Saint-Malo, deputy at the National Convention, and Navy officer.

Career 
Tréhouart-Beaulieu was born Saint-Malo. In early 1793, he and Jean-Jacques Bréard were in a mission on the coasts of Brest and Lorient, and in Brest with Jean Bon Saint-André, Gilbert-Amable Faure-Conac and Prieur de la Marne. He also served as chief of the first division of the Ministry of the Navy.

Tréhouart-Beaulieu captained the frigate Surveillante in late 1793, ferrying Rear-Admiral Joseph Cambis from New York City to Lorient, as well as other passagers and despatches.  He died in Épiniac, aged 50.

Notes and references

Notes

References

Bibliography 
 Fonds Marine. Campagnes (opérations ; divisions et stations navales ; missions diverses). Inventaire de la sous-série Marine BB4. Tome premier : BB4 1 à 482 (1790-1826) 

1754 births
1804 deaths
French Navy officers
French naval commanders of the Napoleonic Wars
Deputies to the French National Convention